Wilkowo  (formerly ) is a village in the administrative district of Gmina Świebodzin, within Świebodzin County, Lubusz Voivodeship, in western Poland.

The village has a population of 1,000.

References

Villages in Świebodzin County